Percy Sayegh (born 27 March 1965) is a former Lebanese swimmer who competed in the 1984 Summer Olympics.

References 

1965 births
Living people
Lebanese male freestyle swimmers
Olympic swimmers of Lebanon
Swimmers at the 1984 Summer Olympics
Place of birth missing (living people)